Pembroke is an unincorporated community in Lincoln Township, Newton County, in the U.S. state of Indiana.

History
The community was likely named after Pembroke, in Wales.

Geography

References

Unincorporated communities in Newton County, Indiana
Unincorporated communities in Indiana